Rynard Jaco 'Ligtoring' Landman (born 24 July 1986) is a South African rugby union player. He usually plays as a lock and occasionally as a flanker.

Career
Strong performances in the local Vodacom Cup and Currie Cup competitions allied to injuries to Martin Muller and Andries Ferreira saw him become an important member of the  team that reached the play-offs in the 2013 Super Rugby season.

Newport Gwent Dragons
Landman signed for Welsh side the Dragons on a three-year deal prior to the 2014–15 Pro12 season.

References

External links 
Dragons profile

1986 births
Living people
Boland Cavaliers players
Cheetahs (rugby union) players
Dragons RFC players
Expatriate rugby union players in Wales
Griquas (rugby union) players
Leopards (rugby union) players
Lions (United Rugby Championship) players
Rugby union locks
Rugby union players from East London, Eastern Cape
South African expatriate rugby union players
South African expatriate sportspeople in Wales
South African rugby union players
US Carcassonne players